Robert Morton Duncan (August 24, 1927 – November 2, 2012) was a United States district judge of the United States District Court for the Southern District of Ohio.

Education and career

Born on August 24, 1927, in Urbana, Ohio, Duncan received a Bachelor of Science degree from Ohio State University in 1948. He received a Juris Doctor from the Ohio State University Moritz College of Law in 1952. Duncan served in the United States Army in Korea 1952 to 1956. He was an attorney examiner for the Ohio Bureau of Workmen's Compensation from 1959 to 1960. He was city prosecutor for Columbus, Ohio from 1960 to 1963. He was chief counsel to the state attorney general of Ohio from 1963 to 1966. He was a judge of the Franklin County, Ohio Municipal Court from 1966 to 1968. He was a justice of the Ohio Supreme Court from 1968 to 1971.

Federal judicial service

Duncan was a judge of the United States Court of Military Appeals (now the United States Court of Appeals for the Armed Forces) from 1971 to 1974.

Duncan was nominated by President Richard Nixon on May 1, 1974, to a seat on the United States District Court for the Southern District of Ohio vacated by Judge Carl Andrew Weinman. He was confirmed by the United States Senate on June 13, 1974, and received his commission on June 20, 1974. His service was terminated on April 15, 1985, due to his resignation.

Post judicial service

Following his resignation from the federal bench, Duncan returned to private practice with the firm of Jones Day Reavis & Pogue.

Firsts

Duncan was the first African-American elected to judicial office in Franklin County the first to serve on the Ohio Supreme Court, the first to serve on the United States Court of Military Appeals, and the first appointed to the federal bench in Ohio.

Personal

Duncan married his wife Shirley in 1955. They had three children. Duncan died on November 2, 2012.

See also 
 List of African-American federal judges
 List of African-American jurists
 List of first minority male lawyers and judges in Ohio

References

Sources
 

1927 births
2012 deaths
African-American judges
Ohio state court judges
Justices of the Ohio Supreme Court
Judges of the United States Court of Appeals for the Armed Forces
United States federal judges appointed by Richard Nixon
Judges of the United States District Court for the Southern District of Ohio
United States district court judges appointed by Richard Nixon
20th-century American judges
Ohio State University alumni
Ohio State University Moritz College of Law alumni
People from Urbana, Ohio
Lawyers from Columbus, Ohio
Ohio Republicans
United States Army personnel of the Korean War
United States Army soldiers